William Henry Harries (January 15, 1843July 23, 1921) was an American lawyer and Democratic politician.  He was a member of the United States House of Representatives, representing Minnesota during the Fifty-second Congress.  Earlier, he served in the famed Iron Brigade of the Army of the Potomac through most of the American Civil War.

Early life
Harries was born near Dayton, Ohio.  He moved to La Crosse, Wisconsin, and enlisted as a private in Company B, 2nd Wisconsin Infantry Regiment on April 18, 1861. He was wounded at the Battle of Antietam.  He was commissioned captain of Company F, Third Regiment, United States Veteran Volunteers, General Hancock's corps, on December 21, 1864, and was honorably discharged on April 17, 1866.

Legal career
Harries graduated from the law school of the University of Michigan at Ann Arbor in 1868.  He was admitted to the bar in 1868, and commenced practice in Hokah, Minnesota.  He later practiced in Caledonia, Minnesota.  He served as prosecuting attorney of Houston County, Minnesota, from 1874 to 1878.

Political career
He was elected as a Democrat to the Fifty-second Congress and served March 4, 1891, to March 3, 1893.  Harries was an unsuccessful candidate for reelection in 1892 to the Fifty-third Congress.  He was then appointed by President Grover Cleveland as collector of internal revenue for Minnesota and served from 1894 to 1898, residing in St. Paul, Minnesota.

Later years
He resumed his law practice in Caledonia, Minnesota, in 1898. He served as president of the village of Caledonia and a member of its board of education, department commander of the Minnesota department of the Grand Army of the Republic in 1901, member of the board of trustees of the Minnesota Soldiers’ Home in 1903, secretary of the board 1907 to 1911, and commandant of the home 1911 to 1918.  Harries died in Seattle, Washington, on July 23, 1921, and is interred in Evergreen Cemetery, Caledonia, Minnesota.

Personal life
Capt. Harries married Austis L. Dunbar in 1870, and after she died he married her sister Hattie Hadley Dunbar in 1882.  Hattie died in 1895. The father of these two sisters was William F. Dunbar, the first state auditor of Minnesota. The eleven children of these two marriages are Mary Lucretia, Anna Belle, Ethelind, Paul W., Anstice, Hattie, George, Alice, Beth Bernice, Edna Beatrice, and Donald Dunbar.

References

External links

1843 births
1921 deaths
University of Michigan Law School alumni
Democratic Party members of the United States House of Representatives from Minnesota
Politicians from Dayton, Ohio
People from Houston County, Minnesota
People from Caledonia, Minnesota
Grand Army of the Republic officials